The Jesusland map is an Internet meme created shortly after the 2004 U.S. presidential election that satirizes the red/blue states scheme by dividing the United States and Canada into "The United States of Canada" and "Jesusland". The map implies the existence of a fundamental political divide between contiguous northern and southern regions of North America, the former including both the socially liberal Canada and the West Coast, Northeastern, and Upper Midwestern states, and suggests that these states are closer in spirit to Canada than to the more conservative regions of their own country. The Freakonomics blog opined that the map reflected the "despair, division, and bitterness" of the election campaign and results. Slate also covered the image and posited that it might be the reason the Canadian immigration website received six times its usual page views the day after the election.

Origin
The original image was created on November 3, 2004 by G. Webb, a poster on yakyak.org, an Internet message board for fans of the work of Jeff Minter. It quickly became an Internet meme, which The New York Times described as an "instant Internet classic".

Geography
The meme is in the form of a map of the U.S. and Canada which depicts a new hypothetical national border between the two countries. The "blue states" from the 2004 election (New England, the Mid-Atlantic states, the Pacific coast, and the Great Lakes states of Illinois, Michigan, Minnesota, and Wisconsin) have been merged with Canada to form a single contiguous nation of more than 170 million inhabitants, which is labeled the "United States of Canada". The remaining "red states" are labeled as "Jesusland".

Variations

Similar maps give different labels to the geographically separated blue states.  The northeastern states are alternately referred to as "Eastern Realitania", "Northeastistan", "Western France", or "The New American Republic"; the central blue states near the Great Lakes are labeled "Central Realitania" or "Minniwillinois"; and the blue states along the Pacific Coast are called "Western Realitania", "Pacificstan", "Southern Canada" or "Baja Canada" (with Hawaii being separately labeled "The Tropic of Canada").  Another has chosen the overall name "Realistan", and another has chosen "The United States of Liberty and Education". The red states in these variant maps are called "Jesusistan", or "the United State of Texas" in reference to Bush's home state. Some maps purport to show a capital city of Crawford, Texas, then the home of then-President George W. Bush. One map shows Alaska as having been returned to Russia, while a Canadian variant had the province of Alberta, commonly regarded as the most conservative Canadian province, marked as part of Jesusland instead of Canada.

Change of map 
Since Barack Obama's victory in the 2008 United States presidential election, some states which voted for George W. Bush in 2000 and 2004 have become swing states or even turned to lean Democratic. Colorado, New Mexico and Virginia have become Democratic (blue states) while Arizona, Georgia (both red leaning), Michigan, Nevada, North Carolina (red leaning), Pennsylvania and Wisconsin have become swing states.

See also 

 Bible belt
 Blue wall
 Cascadia movement
 Deep South
 Ecotopia
 Conservatism in Canada
 Conservatism in the United States
 The Nine Nations of North America

References

Canada–United States relations in popular culture
Electoral geography of the United States
Political Internet memes
2004 United States presidential election in popular culture
Fictional maps
Fictional North American countries
Maps of the Americas
Geographical neologisms